R.A.P. Music is the fifth studio album by American rapper Killer Mike. It was released through Williams Street Records on May 15, 2012. The "R.A.P." in the album's title is a backronym for "Rebellious African People". Production was handled by rapper and producer Jaime "El-P" Meline; the album was the first collaboration between Killer Mike and El-P, who would later form the critically acclaimed duo Run the Jewels.

Reception

Critical response 

R.A.P. Music received widespread acclaim from music critics. At Metacritic, which assigns a weighted average rating out of 100 to reviews from mainstream critics, the album received an weighted mean average score of 85, based on 27 reviews, which indicates "universal acclaim". Among those who reviewed the album positively was AllMusic editor David Jeffries, who stated "rapper Killer Mike already had an incredibly strong discography before R.A.P. Music landed [...] Revolutionary stuff and absolutely no fluff, R.A.P. Music is outstanding." Evan Rytlewski of The A.V. Club praised the album's production and Mike's politically charged lyrics and wrote "[R.A.P. Music] feels like the culmination of his unusual career." Pitchfork'''s Ian Cohen designated it "Best New Music" and noted that "even if R.A.P. Music doesn't break enough rules or have enough of a platform to reach the levels of Fear of a Black Planet or Straight Outta Compton or Death Certificate . . . it does come off as the kind of powerful mid-career album those acts should've been able to make as hip-hop's elder spokesmen". Christopher Weingarten of Spin wrote: "A child of the '80s and a student of the Internet, Killer Mike is as exciting and wildly unclassifiable as hip-hop gets: New York noise and country shit, nods to when rap was punk and crunk was pop, Ice Cube before he needed hooks, David Banner before he needed to whisper, and Willie D before he needed anybody." Sputnikmusic staff Sobhi Youssef praised El-P's synth-bass-heavy production and Mike's lyricism, and praised the album as "a hip-hop masterpiece to be remembered for years to come".

In a less positive review, NME writer Henry Barnes stated that "Mike has dabbled with politics in the past, and even made unlikely forays into experimental soul, but R.A.P. Music lacks the fury and vitality that usually sustains him. The ambition is to be applauded, but half the album's a grind. And not the good kind."

 Accolades 

 Track listing 
All songs produced by El-P.

 Reagan 
In 2012 on NPR, Killer Mike explained that: "Ronald Reagan was an actor. He was a pitchman at first, and so people naturally trust him. He understood how to weave magic when he was speaking, and that's what we as entertainers do. So when Jay-Z tells you to buy some Reeboks, it means more. Ronald Reagan at one point was the biggest pitchman in the world. I think that Reagan was used by a political party, by people who had vested means, to push their own agendas."

Personnel
Credits for R.A.P. Music adapted from Allmusic.

Joe Baker – booking, management
Bun B – vocals
Regina Davenport – production coordination
Jason DeMarco – executive producer
DJ Abilities – scratching
El-P – engineer, producer, programming, vocals, composer
Nicholas "Nick.R the A&R" Reynolds - A&R, direction
Nicholas Howard – vocals
Killer Mike – vocals, composer, executive producer
G.G. McGee – lyric transcription
Emily Panic – vocals
Fahamu Pecou – paintings

Bradley Post – engineer
Joey Raia – mixing
Scar – vocals
Glenn Schick – mastering
Torbitt Schwartz – guitar
Shanna Sheets – lyric transcription
T.I. – vocals
Trouble – vocals
Amaechi Uzoigwe – management
Trey Wadsworth – design
Wilder Zoby – composer, co-producer

 Charts 

References

 External links 
 R.A.P. Music'' at Metacritic

2012 albums
Killer Mike albums
Albums produced by El-P
Williams Street Records albums